Starogilevo is a rural locality (a village) in Ilyino-Polyansky Selsoviet, Blagoveshchensky District, Bashkortostan, Russia. The population was 9 as of 2010. There is 1 street.

Geography 
Starogilevo is located 28 km northeast of Blagoveshchensk (the district's administrative centre) by road. Nikolskoye is the nearest rural locality.

References 

Rural localities in Blagoveshchensky District